Yanggao County is a county in the northeast of Shanxi province, China, bordering Inner Mongolia to the northwest and Hebei province to the east. It is under the administration of the prefecture-level city of Datong.

History
Yanggao was formerly known as Gaoliu. Under the Qin and Western Han, it was part of Dai Commandery. Under the Eastern Han, it served as the prefectural seat, although lost this status to Daixian (near present-day Yuzhou in Hebei) during the Three Kingdoms Period.

Climate

See also
 Other Gaolius

References

Citations

Bibliography
 www.xzqh.org 
 .

County-level divisions of Shanxi
Datong